Qurayba "the Younger" bint Abi Umayya, a companion of Muhammad, and was in succession, a wife of, the later second caliph Umar and the first Umayyad caliph Mu'awiya.

Biography

Family
She was from the Makhzum clan of the Quraysh tribe in Mecca. Her father, Abu Umayya ibn al-Mughira, was the chief of Mecca in the early seventh century. Her mother was Atika bint Utba, a member of the Abdshams clan of the Quraysh. Hence Hind bint Utba was her maternal aunt while Umm Salama was her paternal sister.

First marriage 
She married Umar before 616. Umar was concurrently married to Zaynab bint Maz'un and to Umm Kulthum bint Jarwal, who had between them five children, while Qurayba was childless.

Umar converted to Islam in 616. The whole family emigrated to Medina in 622, although Umm Kulthum and Qurayba were still polytheists. Quarayba is briefly mentioned in Medina in an incident when she helped to care for her sister Umm Salama's baby.

Soon after the Treaty of Hudaybiya in 628, Muhammad (صلى الله عليه و سلم) announced a revelation that Muslims were ordered to "hold not to the cords of disbelieving women." Accordingly, Umar divorced Umm Kulthum and Qurayba, and they both returned to Mecca.

Second Marriage
Qurayba then married her cousin, Mu'awiya ibn Abi Sufyan, "while they were both still polytheists", i.e., before January 630. However, Mu'awiya I also divorced her. But Qurayba had 3 daughters with Mu'awiya I, they are Umm Hakim, Umm Sa'id and Umm Habib

Third marriage
Later she was courted by Abd al-Rahman ibn Abi Bakr. Aisha negotiated for her brother, and the Makhzum family agreed to the match. Abd al-Rahman and Qurayba had three children: Abd Allah, Umm Hakim, Asma, Muhammad and Hafsa.

Abd al-Rahman had a reputation for being "harsh" with women, and the Makhzum family protested his treatment of Qurayba. They claimed that they had only given consent because of Aisha, who now conveyed their concerns to her brother. One day Qurayba exclaimed, "I was warned about you!" and Abd al-Rahman replied, "I will divorce you if you like." She then changed her mind and said, "I will not prefer anyone over Abu Bakr's son." They remained together.

References

Umar
Banu Makhzum